Julien Louis Rochedy (born 10 March 1988) is a French politician from the National Rally. He was President of Génération Nation from 2012 to 2014.

Early life 
He was born in Guilherand-Granges in Ardèche.

Education 
He graduated from Jean Moulin University Lyon 3.

Political career 
He was a candidate in the 2014 European Parliament election.

Political activities 
He met Syrian President Bashar al-Assad in 2014. He operates a popular YouTube channel.

Personal life 
From 2019 to 2020, he was in a relationship with Dutch politician, Eva Vlaardingerbroek.

References 

Living people
1988 births
National Rally (France) politicians

People from Ardèche
French YouTubers